This is a list of notable people from Tanzania.

Artists
 George Lilanga (1934–2005), Makonde artist

Business people
 Ali Mufuruki (1959–2019)
 Mohammed Dewji (born 1975)
 Reginald Mengi (c.1943–2019)

Musicians
 Diamond Platnumz (born 1989), artist, songwriter and dancer
 Bill Nass (born 1993), rapper
 Ali Kiba (born 1980), artist, singer-songwriter, dancer and actor
 Nahreel (born 1989), producer, artist in Navy Kenzo Duo group
 Cool James (1970–2002), rapper
 Dully Sykes (born 1981), rapper 
 Joseph Haule (Professor Jay) (born 1975), rapper
 Baby Madaha (born 1988), singer
 Ray C (born 1982), artist, singer-songwriter 
 Harmonize (born 1991), musician
 Saida Karoli (born 1976), singer
 Bi Kidude (c. 1910s–2013), Zanzibari Taarab singer
 George Kinyonga (died 1992), Kenyan/Tanzanian musician
 Wilson Kinyonga (died 1995), Kenyan/Tanzanian musician
 Lady Jaydee (born 1979), pop singer
 Joseph Mbilinyi (Mr. II) (born 1972), rapper
 Rose Mhando (born 1976), gospel singer
 Daniel Owino Misiani (1940–2006), Kenyan/Tanzanian benga musician
 Tumi Molekane (born 1981), South African/Tanzanian rapper
 Imani Sanga (born 1972), composer and ethnomusicologist
 Siti binti Saad (1880–1950), Taarab singer
 Nakaaya Sumari (born 1982), model and singer
 Hukwe Zawose (1938–2003), singer
 Freddie Mercury (1946–1991), lead singer of Queen
 Mimi Mars (born 1992), singer and actress
 Barnaba Classic, singer-songwriter
 Lucas Mkenda, singer
 Lava Lava (born 1993), singer
 Darassa, rapper
 Albert Mangwea, rapper
 Abby Chams, singer and social activist
 Aslay (born 1995), singer
 RJ The DJ, (born 1988), DJ, singer and actor
Gigy Money, (born 1998), singer and socialite

Politicians
 Bibi Titi Mohammed (1926–1963), founding member of the Tanganyika African National Union
 Jakaya Kikwete (born 1950), President of Tanzania from 2005 to 2015
 Gertrude Mongella (born 1945), president of the Pan-African Parliament
 William F. Shija (1947–2014), member of the National Assembly of Tanzania from 1990 to 2005
 Freeman Mbowe (born 14 September 1961), leader of CHADEMA
 Joseph Kakunda (born 1968), Minister of Trade, MP
 Anna Abdallah (born 1940), Member of Parliament
 Maida Abdallah (born 1970), Member of Parliament
 Mohamed Rished Abdallah (born 1952), Member of Parliament
 Mohammed Abdi Abdulaziz (born 1958), Member of Parliament
 Bahati Ali Abeid (born 1967), Member of Parliament
 Juma Jamaldin Akukweti (1947–2007), Member of Parliament
 Khadija Salum Ally Al-Qassmy (born 1958), Member of Parliament
 Ali Haji Ali (born 1948), Member of Parliament
 Ali Tarab Ali (born 1947), Member of Parliament
 Fatma Ali (born 1950), Member of Parliament
 Aziza Sleyum Ally, Member of Parliament
 Ame Pandu Ame (born 1963), Member of Parliament
 Ameir Ali Ameir (born 1961), Member of Parliament
 Paul Bomani (1925–2005), ambassador
 Remidus E. Kissassi, member of the African Union's Pan-African Parliament
 Tatu Mussa Ntimizi, Member of Parliament 1990–2010

Royalty
 Abdullah bin Khalifa of Zanzibar (1910–1963), tenth Sultan of Zanzibar
 Thomas Marealle (1915–2007), Paramount Chief of the Chagga people
 Mangi Meli, Chagga chief who was hanged by German colonialists
 Chief Mkwawa (1855–1898), Hehe chief
 Emily Ruete (Sayyida Salme) (1844–1924), Princess of Zanzibar

Sportspeople
 Hasheem Thabeet (born 1986), basketball player
 Mbwana Ally Samatta (born 1993), football player
 Martin Kolikoli (born 1989), basketball player
 Erasto Nyoni (born 2000), football player
 Feisal Salum (born 1998), footballer

Writers
 Christopher Mwashinga (born 1965), writer and poet
 Muhammed Said Abdulla (1918–1991), journalist and novelist
 Euphrase Kezilahabi (1944–2020), novelist and poet
 Amandina Lihamba (born 1944), playwright
 Fadhy Mtanga (born 1981), writer, poet, photographer and blogger
 Godfrey Mwakikagile (born 1949), writer, scholar and specialist in Africa studies
 Justinian Rweyemamu (1942–1982), economist, mathematician and writer
 Leonard Shayo (born 1948), writer, mathematics, columnist
 Julius Nyang'oro (born 1954), writer, political scientist and legal scholar
 Mathias E. Mnyampala (1917–1969), lawyer, writer, and poet
 Shaaban bin Robert (1909–1962), poet, author, essayist
 Julius Nyerere (1922–1999), politician, writer, philosopher
Sandra A. Mushi, interior designer, published author, poet
Richard Mabala, writer of short stories, columnist and poet (born 1949)
Joseph Marwa, novelist, poet and actor (born 1999)
Nahida Esmail, writer of short stories and social activist

Miscellaneous
 Jayantilal Chande (1928–2017), businessman and philanthropist
 Patrick Chokala, ambassador to Russia
 Sajjad Fazel, (born 1991), health researcher and columnist
 Benjamin Fernandes (born 1992), TV presenter and public speaker
 Geline Fuko (born c.1980), lawyer and human rights activist
 Mustafa Hassanali (born 1980), fashion designer
 Salma Kikwete (born 1963), wife of President Jakaya Kikwete
 Joyce Kinabo (born 1955), food scientist and researcher
 Flaviana Matata (born 1987), fashion model
 Mirambo (1840–1884), Nyamwezi warlord
 Kinjikitile Ngwale (died 1905), medium and leader of the Maji Maji Rebellion
 John Okello (1937–1971), revolutionary
 Polycarp Pengo (born 1944), cardinal, archbishop of Dar es Salaam
 Mr Puaz (born 1985), talent manager and entrepreneur
 Rakesh Rajani (born 1966), world civil society leader
 Laurean Rugambwa (1912–1997), cardinal, archbishop of Dar es Salaam
 Nancy Sumari (born 1986), Miss Tanzania 2005
 Anna Tibaijuka (born 1950), Under-Secretary-General of the United Nations
 Maria Sarungi Tsehai, activist
 Myles Turner (1921–1984), warden of the Serengeti National Park
 Frederick Werema (born 1954), former attorney general of Tanzania

References